The 1985–86 NBA season was the Detroit Pistons' 38th season in the NBA and 29th season in Detroit.  The team played at the Pontiac Silverdome in surburban Pontiac, Michigan.

The year got off to an excellent start as the Pistons drafted  future Hall of Famer Joe Dumars with the 18th pick in the first-round of the 1985 NBA Draft. The team's steady rise in recent years stalled
during the 1985–86 season as the Pistons finished 46–36 (.561), 3rd in the Central Division.  The team advanced to the playoffs but were beaten 3–1 by Dominique Wilkins and the rising Atlanta Hawks.  When the series ended, Piston guard and team leader Isiah Thomas said, “All I know,” Isiah would say, eyes fixed straight ahead and locked on nothing in particular, jaw firmly set, amid the spartan if spacious locker room underneath the stands at the Silverdome, “is something has to change next year.” 

The Pistons were led by guard Thomas (20.9 ppg, 10.8 apg, NBA All-Star), center Bill Laimbeer (16.6 ppg, 13.1 rpg), and guard Vinnie "the Microwave" Johnson (13.9 ppg).  Dumars (9.4 ppg) was named to the NBA All-Rookie Team.  Before the 1986-87 Detroit Pistons season began, driven by Thomas, the Pistons would trade away several key players, including forward Kelly Tripucka, center Kent Benson and guard John Long.

Draft picks

Roster

Regular season

Season standings

z – clinched division title
y – clinched division title
x – clinched playoff spot

Record vs. opponents

Game log

Regular season

|- align="center" bgcolor="#ccffcc"
| 1
| October 25, 1985
| Milwaukee
| W 118–116
|
|
|
| Pontiac Silverdome
| 1–0
|- align="center" bgcolor="#ffcccc"
| 2
| October 26, 1985
| @ Chicago
| L 118–121
|
|
|
| Chicago Stadium
| 1–1
|- align="center" bgcolor="#ccffcc"
| 3
| October 29, 1985
| New Jersey
| W 124–107
|
|
|
| Pontiac Silverdome
| 2–1
|- align="center" bgcolor="#ffcccc"
| 4
| October 30, 1985
| @ Philadelphia
| L 125–132 (OT)
|
|
|
| The Spectrum
| 2–2

|- align="center" bgcolor="#ccffcc"
| 5
| November 1, 1985
| Indiana
| W 124–116
|
|
|
| Pontiac Silverdome
| 3–2
|- align="center" bgcolor="#ccffcc"
| 6
| November 2, 1985
| @ Indiana
| W 128–117
|
|
|
| Market Square Arena
| 4–2
|- align="center" bgcolor="#ccffcc"
| 7
| November 6, 1985
| Chicago
| W 122–105
|
|
|
| Pontiac Silverdome
| 5–2
|- align="center" bgcolor="#ccffcc"
| 8
| November 8, 1985
| @ Washington
| W 117–110
|
|
|
| Capital Centre
| 6–2
|- align="center" bgcolor="#ffcccc"
| 9
| November 9, 1985
| Boston
| L 105–124
|
|
|
| Pontiac Silverdome
| 6–3
|- align="center" bgcolor="#ccffcc"
| 10
| November 12, 1985
| Washington
| W 124–122 (OT)
|
|
|
| Pontiac Silverdome
| 7–3
|- align="center" bgcolor="#ffcccc"
| 11
| November 13, 1985
| @ Milwaukee
| L 118–137
|
|
|
| MECCA Arena
| 7–4
|- align="center" bgcolor="#ffcccc"
| 12
| November 15, 19857:30p.m. EST
| @ Atlanta
| L 118–122
| Thomas (26)
| Laimbeer (14)
| Thomas (14)
| The Omni12,924
| 7–5
|- align="center" bgcolor="#ccffcc"
| 13
| November 20, 1985
| New York
| W 109–98
|
|
|
| Pontiac Silverdome
| 8–5
|- align="center" bgcolor="#ccffcc"
| 14
| November 22, 1985
| Golden State
| W 115–96
|
|
|
| Pontiac Silverdome
| 9–5
|- align="center" bgcolor="#ccffcc"
| 15
| November 23, 1985
| @ Philadelphia
| W 119–114
|
|
|
| The Spectrum
| 10–5
|- align="center" bgcolor="#ccffcc"
| 16
| November 26, 1985
| Cleveland
| W 113–98
|
|
|
| Pontiac Silverdome
| 11–5
|- align="center" bgcolor="#ffcccc"
| 17
| November 27, 1985
| @ Boston
| L 124–132
|
|
|
| Boston Garden
| 11–6
|- align="center" bgcolor="#ccffcc"
| 18
| November 29, 1985
| Milwaukee
| W 111–102
|
|
|
| Pontiac Silverdome
| 12–6
|- align="center" bgcolor="#ffcccc"
| 19
| November 30, 1985
| @ Washington
| L 119–133
|
|
|
| Capital Centre
| 12–7

|- align="center" bgcolor="#ffcccc"
| 20
| December 3, 1985
| Philadelphia
| L 107–127
|
|
|
| Pontiac Silverdome
| 12–8
|- align="center" bgcolor="#ccffcc"
| 21
| December 5, 1985
| New Jersey
| W 113–111
|
|
|
| Pontiac Silverdome
| 13–8
|- align="center" bgcolor="#ffcccc"
| 22
| December 7, 1985
| Sacramento
| L 112–122
|
|
|
| Pontiac Silverdome
| 13–9
|- align="center" bgcolor="#ccffcc"
| 23
| December 10, 1985
| @ Cleveland
| W 130–120
|
|
|
| Richfield Coliseum
| 14–9
|- align="center" bgcolor="#ffcccc"
| 24
| December 11, 1985
| Washington
| L 100–108
|
|
|
| Pontiac Silverdome
| 14–10
|- align="center" bgcolor="#ffcccc"
| 25
| December 13, 1985
| San Antonio
| L 113–119
|
|
|
| Pontiac Silverdome
| 14–11
|- align="center" bgcolor="#ffcccc"
| 26
| December 15, 1985
| @ L.A. Lakers
| L 119–132
|
|
|
| The Forum
| 14–12
|- align="center" bgcolor="#ffcccc"
| 27
| December 17, 1985
| @ Sacramento
| L 121–132
|
|
|
| ARCO Arena
| 14–13
|- align="center" bgcolor="#ccffcc"
| 28
| December 19, 1985
| @ Seattle
| W 99–97
|
|
|
| Seattle Center Coliseum
| 15–13
|- align="center" bgcolor="#ffcccc"
| 29
| December 21, 1985
| @ New York
| L 110–112
|
|
|
| Madison Square Garden
| 15–14
|- align="center" bgcolor="#ffcccc"
| 30
| December 26, 1985
| @ New Jersey
| L 116–124
|
|
|
| Brendan Byrne Arena
| 15–15
|- align="center" bgcolor="#ffcccc"
| 31
| December 27, 1985
| Cleveland
| L 105–119
|
|
|
| Pontiac Silverdome
| 15–16
|- align="center" bgcolor="#ffcccc"
| 32
| December 30, 1985
| @ Milwaukee
| L 110–121
|
|
|
| MECCA Arena
| 15–17

|- align="center" bgcolor="#ffcccc"
| 33
| January 2, 1986
| @ Chicago
| L 122–131
|
|
|
| Chicago Stadium
| 15–18
|- align="center" bgcolor="#ffcccc"
| 34
| January 3, 19867:30p.m. EST
| @ Atlanta
| L 101–111
| Tripucka (26)
| Laimbeer (17)
| Thomas (5)
| The Omni15,817
| 15–19
|- align="center" bgcolor="#ccffcc"
| 35
| January 7, 1986
| Boston
| W 113–109
|
|
|
| Pontiac Silverdome
| 16–19
|- align="center" bgcolor="#ffcccc"
| 36
| January 9, 19867:30p.m. EST
| Atlanta
| L 99–110
| Dumars (21)
| Laimbeer (14)
| Thomas (9)
| Pontiac Silverdome9,400
| 16–20
|- align="center" bgcolor="#ffcccc"
| 37
| January 11, 1986
| Philadelphia
| L 101–102
|
|
|
| Pontiac Silverdome
| 16–21
|- align="center" bgcolor="#ccffcc"
| 38
| January 15, 1986
| Chicago
| W 123–115
|
|
|
| Pontiac Silverdome
| 17–21
|- align="center" bgcolor="#ccffcc"
| 39
| January 17, 1986
| Denver
| W 129–113
|
|
|
| Pontiac Silverdome
| 18–21
|- align="center" bgcolor="#ccffcc"
| 40
| January 19, 1986
| L.A. Lakers
| W 118–115
|
|
|
| Pontiac Silverdome
| 19–21
|- align="center" bgcolor="#ffcccc"
| 41
| January 20, 1986
| @ Indiana
| L 99–105
|
|
|
| Market Square Arena
| 19–22
|- align="center" bgcolor="#ccffcc"
| 42
| January 22, 1986
| @ Cleveland
| W 107–104
|
|
|
| Richfield Coliseum
| 20–22
|- align="center" bgcolor="#ccffcc"
| 43
| January 24, 1986
| @ Dallas
| W 129–120
|
|
|
| Reunion Arena
| 21–22
|- align="center" bgcolor="#ffcccc"
| 44
| January 25, 1986
| @ Houston
| L 112–117
|
|
|
| The Summit
| 21–23
|- align="center" bgcolor="#ccffcc"
| 45
| January 27, 1986
| @ San Antonio
| W 118–117
|
|
|
| HemisFair Arena
| 22–23
|- align="center" bgcolor="#ccffcc"
| 46
| January 29, 19867:30p.m. EST
| Atlanta
| W 107–94
| Johnson (24)
| Laimbeer (10)
| Thomas (13)
| Pontiac Silverdome12,386
| 23–23
|- align="center" bgcolor="#ffcccc"
| 47
| January 31, 19867:30p.m. EST
| @ Atlanta
| L 103–116
| Dumars (22)
| Laimbeer (16)
| Thomas (9)
| The Omni12,624
| 23–24

|- align="center" bgcolor="#ccffcc"
| 48
| February 1, 1986
| Washington
| W 116–101
|
|
|
| Pontiac Silverdome
| 24–24
|- align="center" bgcolor="#ccffcc"
| 49
| February 4, 1986
| @ Chicago
| W 117–115
|
|
|
| Chicago Stadium
| 25–24
|- align="center" bgcolor="#ccffcc"
| 50
| February 6, 1986
| @ Washington
| W 111–109 (OT)
|
|
|
| Capital Centre
| 26–24
|- align="center"
|colspan="9" bgcolor="#bbcaff"|All-Star Break
|- style="background:#cfc;"
|- bgcolor="#bbffbb"
|- align="center" bgcolor="#ffcccc"
| 51
| February 11, 1986
| @ New Jersey
| L 122–130
|
|
|
| Brendan Byrne Arena
| 26–25
|- align="center" bgcolor="#ccffcc"
| 52
| February 12, 1986
| New York
| W 113–99
|
|
|
| Pontiac Silverdome
| 27–25
|- align="center" bgcolor="#ccffcc"
| 53
| February 14, 1986
| Dallas
| W 119–110
|
|
|
| Pontiac Silverdome
| 28–25
|- align="center" bgcolor="#ccffcc"
| 54
| February 15, 1986
| Philadelphia
| W 134–133 (OT)
|
|
|
| Pontiac Silverdome
| 29–25
|- align="center" bgcolor="#ccffcc"
| 55
| February 17, 1986
| Utah
| W 117–96
|
|
|
| Pontiac Silverdome
| 30–25
|- align="center" bgcolor="#ccffcc"
| 56
| February 19, 1986
| Seattle
| W 118–113
|
|
|
| Pontiac Silverdome
| 31–25
|- align="center" bgcolor="#ccffcc"
| 57
| February 20, 1986
| @ Cleveland
| W 109–107
|
|
|
| Richfield Coliseum
| 32–25
|- align="center" bgcolor="#ccffcc"
| 58
| February 22, 1986
| Portland
| W 113–106
|
|
|
| Pontiac Silverdome
| 33–25
|- align="center" bgcolor="#ccffcc"
| 59
| February 24, 1986
| Chicago
| W 110–100
|
|
|
| Pontiac Silverdome
| 34–25
|- align="center" bgcolor="#ccffcc"
| 60
| February 26, 1986
| L.A. Clippers
| W 111–104
|
|
|
| Pontiac Silverdome
| 35–25
|- align="center" bgcolor="#ccffcc"
| 61
| February 28, 19867:30p.m. EST
| Atlanta
| W 115–103
| Thomas  (30)
| Laimbeer (11)
| Dumars, Thomas (6)
| Pontiac Silverdome25,888
| 36–25

|- align="center" bgcolor="#ffcccc"
| 62
| March 2, 1986
| @ Boston
| L 109–129
|
|
|
| Boston Garden
| 36–26
|- align="center" bgcolor="#ccffcc"
| 63
| March 4, 1986
| New Jersey
| W 120–103
|
|
|
| Pontiac Silverdome
| 37–26
|- align="center" bgcolor="#ccffcc"
| 64
| March 7, 1986
| @ New Jersey
| W 104–102
|
|
|
| Brendan Byrne Arena
| 38–26
|- align="center" bgcolor="#ffcccc"
| 65
| March 10, 1986
| Phoenix
| L 109–120
|
|
|
| Pontiac Silverdome
| 38–27
|- align="center" bgcolor="#ccffcc"
| 66
| March 12, 1986
| Indiana
| W 111–101
|
|
|
| Pontiac Silverdome
| 39–27
|- align="center" bgcolor="#ccffcc"
| 67
| March 14, 1986
| New York
| W 112–89
|
|
|
| Pontiac Silverdome
| 40–27
|- align="center" bgcolor="#ffcccc"
| 68
| March 16, 1986
| @ Portland
| L 109–119
|
|
|
| Memorial Coliseum
| 40–28
|- align="center" bgcolor="#ffcccc"
| 69
| March 17, 1986
| @ Utah
| L 106–107
|
|
|
| Salt Palace Acord Arena
| 40–29
|- align="center" bgcolor="#ffcccc"
| 70
| March 19, 1986
| @ Denver
| L 98–114
|
|
|
| McNichols Sports Arena
| 40–30
|- align="center" bgcolor="#ffcccc"
| 71
| March 21, 1986
| @ Phoenix
| L 103–105
|
|
|
| Arizona Veterans Memorial Coliseum
| 40–31
|- align="center" bgcolor="#ccffcc"
| 72
| March 22, 1986
| @ L.A. Clippers
| W 119–99
|
|
|
| Los Angeles Memorial Sports Arena
| 41–31
|- align="center" bgcolor="#ffcccc"
| 73
| March 25, 1986
| @ Golden State
| L 121–125
|
|
|
| Oakland-Alameda County Coliseum Arena
| 41–32
|- align="center" bgcolor="#ccffcc"
| 74
| March 28, 1986
| Houston
| W 116–107
|
|
|
| Pontiac Silverdome
| 42–32
|- align="center" bgcolor="#ffcccc"
| 75
| March 29, 1986
| @ Milwaukee
| L 121–130
|
|
|
| MECCA Arena
| 42–33

|- align="center" bgcolor="#ccffcc"
| 76
| April 1, 1986
| Indiana
| W 116–108
|
|
|
| Pontiac Silverdome
| 43–33
|- align="center" bgcolor="#ffcccc"
| 77
| April 2, 1986
| @ Boston
| L 106–122
|
|
|
| Boston Garden
| 43–34
|- align="center" bgcolor="#ffcccc"
| 78
| April 4, 1986
| Milwaukee
| L 108–115
|
|
|
| Pontiac Silverdome
| 43–35
|- align="center" bgcolor="#ccffcc"
| 79
| April 5, 1986
| @ Indiana
| W 115–106
|
|
|
| Market Square Arena
| 44–35
|- align="center" bgcolor="#ccffcc"
| 80
| April 7, 1986
| Cleveland
| W 128–104
|
|
|
| Pontiac Silverdome
| 45–35
|- align="center" bgcolor="#ffcccc"
| 81
| April 8, 1986
| @ Philadelphia
| L 112–116
|
|
|
| The Spectrum
| 45–36
|- align="center" bgcolor="#ccffcc"
| 82
| April 11, 1986
| @ New York
| W 108–95
|
|
|
| Madison Square Garden
| 46–36

Playoffs

|- align="center" bgcolor="#ffcccc"
| 1
| April 17, 19868:00p.m. EST
| @ Atlanta
| L 122–140
| Laimbeer (26)
| Laimbeer (17)
| Thomas (16)
| The Omni12,538
| 0–1
|- align="center" bgcolor="#ffcccc"
| 2
| April 19, 19863:30p.m. EST
| @ Atlanta
| L 125–137
| Thomas (36)
| Laimbeer (12)
| Thomas (9)
| The Omni12,964
| 0–2
|- align="center" bgcolor="#ccffcc"
| 3
| April 22, 19868:00p.m. EST
| Atlanta
| W 106–97
| Tripucka (33)
| Laimbeer (14)
| Thomas (11)
| Pontiac Silverdome13,312
| 1–2
|- align="center" bgcolor="#ffcccc"
| 4
| April 25, 19868:00p.m. EST
| Atlanta
| L 113–114 (2OT)
| Thomas (30)
| Laimbeer (13)
| Thomas (12)
| Pontiac Silverdome15,288
| 1–3
|-

Awards and records
Isiah Thomas, All-NBA First Team
Joe Dumars, NBA All-Rookie Team 1st Team

References

See also
1985-86 NBA season

Detroit Pistons seasons
Det
Detroit Pistons
Detroit Pistons